The 2018–19 Appalachian State Mountaineers men's basketball team represented Appalachian State University during the 2018–19 NCAA Division I men's basketball season. The Mountaineers, led by fifth-year head coach Jim Fox, played their home games at the George M. Holmes Convocation Center in Boone, North Carolina as members of the Sun Belt Conference. They finished the season 11–21, 6–12 in Sun Belt play to finish in 10th place. They lost in the first round of the Sun Belt tournament to Louisiana–Monroe.

Previous season
The Mountaineers finished the 2017–18 season 15–18, 9–9 in Sun Belt play to finish in a three-way tie for fifth place. They defeated Little Rock in the first round of the Sun Belt tournament before losing in the quarterfinals to UT Arlington.

Roster

Schedule and results

|-
!colspan=9 style=| Exhibition

|-
!colspan=9 style=| Non-conference regular season

|-
!colspan=9 style=| Sun Belt Conference regular season

|-
!colspan=9 style=| Sun Belt tournament

Source

References

Appalachian State Mountaineers men's basketball seasons
Appalachian State
Appalachian State
Appalachian State